Ranchi Lok Sabha constituency is one of the 14 Lok Sabha (parliamentary)  constituencies in Jharkhand state in eastern India. This constituency covers parts of Seraikela Kharsawan and Ranchi districts.

Assembly segments
Presently, Ranchi Lok Sabha constituency comprises the following six Vidhan Sabha (legislative assembly) segments:

Members of Parliament
1952: Abdul Ibrahim, Indian National Congress
1957: Minoo Masani (Minocher Rustom Masani), Independent
1962: P. K. Ghosh, Indian National Congress
1967: P. K. Ghosh, Indian National Congress
1971: P. K. Ghosh, Indian National Congress
1977: Ravindra Varma, Bharatiya Lok Dal
1980: Shiv Prasad Sahu, Indian National Congress
1984: Shiv Prasad Sahu, Indian National Congress
1989: Subodh Kant Sahay, Janata Dal
1991: Ram Tahal Choudhary, Bharatiya Janata Party
1996: Ram Tahal Choudhary, Bharatiya Janata Party
1998: Ram Tahal Choudhary, Bharatiya Janata Party
1999: Ram Tahal Choudhary, Bharatiya Janata Party
2004: Subodh Kant Sahay, Indian National Congress
2009: Subodh Kant Sahay, Indian National Congress
2014: Ram Tahal Choudhary, Bharatiya Janata Party
2019: Sanjay Seth, Bharatiya Janata Party

Election results

17th Lok Sabha: 2019 General Elections

See also
 Ranchi district
 List of Constituencies of the Lok Sabha

Notes

External links
Ranchi lok sabha  constituency election 2019 result details

References

Lok Sabha constituencies in Jharkhand
Ranchi district